Va por México ( or figuratively "It’s for Mexico") is a Mexican electoral alliance formed by the National Action Party (PAN), the Institutional Revolutionary Party (PRI), and the Party of the Democratic Revolution (PRD) to compete in the 2021 Mexican legislative election.

The coalition competed in 171 electoral districts, of which 60 corresponded to candidates of the PRI, 57 to candidates of the PAN, and 54 to candidates of the PRD.

History 

The coalition arose in opposition to MORENA, its political alliance Juntos Hacemos Historia, and the presidency of Andrés Manuel López Obrador.

Marko Cortés, National President of the PAN, assured that although there was debate over the coalition within the party, the critical situation in the country, where "institutions and the democratic system are threatened", was put at the forefront of the decision to participate. He also stressed a modernization agenda and the objective "to defend what we have achieved over many years".

The coalition claims to support social causes, the defense of employment, support for small and medium-sized enterprises (SMEs), and the eradication of violence against women.

The coalition will field candidates in 171 of the 300 federal electoral districts, covering all the districts of 18 states and some districts of five others. Of these, 60 will belong to the PRI, 57 to the PAN, and 54 to the PRD.

On September 7th 2022, after the Institutional Revolutionary Party (PRI) announced negotiations with MORENA over a security bill, the National Action Party (PAN) and the Party of the Democratic Revolution (PRD) announced a "temporary suspension" of the alliance  However, the political parties declared on January 12 that they had reestablished their alliance and would now compete in several gubernatorial and presidential elections in 2024.

State elections 

The coalition is also competing in the 2021 state elections, in which the governors of 15 states will be elected. In each state, the coalition is made up of different parties, incorporating in some cases state political parties.

References 

2021 elections in Mexico
2020 in Mexico
Political organizations based in Mexico
Political party alliances in Mexico